Major Indoor Soccer League has been the name of three different American professional indoor soccer leagues:

Major Indoor Soccer League (1978–1992), known in its final two seasons as the Major Soccer League
Major Indoor Soccer League (2001–2008), founded by former NPSL teams and later joined by WISL teams
Major Indoor Soccer League (2008–2014), known as the National Indoor Soccer League in 2008 and adopted the MISL name in 2009